The Making of a Martyr is a 2006 film made by Canadian directors Brooke Goldstein and Alistair Leyland.

Story
On March 25, 2004,  a  16-year-old boy Hussam Abdo, was apprehended at an Israeli border checkpoint with live explosives strapped around his waist. He was noticed running towards the checkpoint and ordered to stop by Israeli soldiers. Instead of detonating the bomb, Hussam surrendered, and after the removal of his suicide belt, was sent to a juvenile detention ward of an Israeli prison for attempted murder. Since the start of the Palestinian Intifada in 2000, an alarming number of suicide bombers have been children aged under 18. To explore this troubling phenomenon, filmmakers Brooke Goldstein and Alistair Leyland risked their lives and travelled to the Palestinian towns of Jenin, Ramallah, Tulkarem, and Nablus, seeking out and meeting with leaders of the organizations responsible for recruiting children for these  suicide attacks. The directors find themselves with unprecedented access to Hussam’s home in Nablus, with his mother, father and sister; to the Israeli prison where he is held; to Zakaria Zubeidi, commander of the al-Aqsa Martyrs' Brigades in Jenin; to Palestinian Television headquarters in Ramallah; to the Islamic Jihad Summer Academy in Tulkarem; and more. Their interviews are a window into the causes behind the recent phenomenon of child suicide bombers, and why Palestinian children make such decisions.

Purpose
First-time director and attorney Brooke Goldstein made this film with the intent of facilitating the enforcement of Palestinian children’s human rights, namely their right to life and to an education free of incitement. Director/Producer Alistair Leyland has been an advocate of providing exposure to human rights abuses for some time. Having spent time covering the "one child policy" in China and its effects on infant girls, Leyland knew the story of a 16-year-old Palestinian suicide bomber was both horrifying and complex.

{{blockquote
 |text=It was after shooting tens of hours of interviews in the region that I finally realized these children are being preyed upon by higher powers. This issue needed to be addressed, his [Abdo's] story needed to be told.
 |sign= The Making of a Martyr'''s Director/Producer Alistair Leyland
 }}

Awards
In April 2006, The Second Annual United Nations Documentary Film Festival honored The Making of a Martyr with the Audience Choice Award for Best Film. Brooke Goldstein and Alistair Leyland were on-site to accept their first award for this film.

Official selections include: Brooklyn International Film Festival (2007); Malibu International Film Festival (2007);  Shoot-Me Film Festival (2007); Liberty Film Festival (2007); Whistler Film Festival (2006); Anchorage International Film Festival (2006); United Nations Documentary Film Exposition, London, England (2006); Shoot-Me Film Festival The Hague (2007).

 Background 
The Israeli-Palestinian conflict began when Britain pledged to establish “a national home for the Jewish people” in Palestine. Increased Jewish migration to Palestine led to accelerating violence between the Jews and the Palestinians eventually lead to the Arab-Israeli war in 1948. The war ended with the Israeli forces controlling 78% of historical Palestine. The results of the war are known as the Nakba'' for the Palestinians. Israel and the Palestinians are still in vicious cycle of violence till this day with Palestinians armed resistance and Israel's refusing to grant Palestinian refugees the right to return and settlement expansion in the West Bank.

References

External links

Online media - videos 
 Making of a Martyr - Trailer Video. 
 Making of a Martyr Bonus Features - Walid Shoebat: Part 1, Part 2.

Other 
 New York Sun Article
 Op Ed in New York Daily News
UN Film Festival website
'The Making of a Martyr' on AOL True Stories
 Article in Jewish Week
 Jewcy.com Article

2006 films
2006 documentary films
Canadian documentary films
Suicide bombing in the Israeli–Palestinian conflict
Documentary films about jihadism
Documentary films about the Israeli–Palestinian conflict
2000s Canadian films